Nerang National Park (commonly referred to as Nerang State Forest) is a national park in Queensland, Australia situated on the Gold Coast.

Nerang National Park is known for its variety of birds, trails, and views. Making it a popular place for mountain bike riders, bushwalkers and bird watchers.

Nerang National Park is of cultural significance to the local indigenous people, the Kombumerri clan.

Environment
Nerang National Park is an open forest environment providing a habitat for lot of native and non-native animals. The Nerang National Park is mostly small-large hills. Both the Coombabah and Saltwater creeks run through the Nerang National Park. The soil in the park is mostly clay and limestone though near rivers and in fertile areas the soil is more loamy and aerated.

Towards the centre of Nerang National Park is a small patch of critically endangered subtropical lowland rainforest, listed under the EPBC Act 1999. This area of the National Park is the headwaters of the Ramsar-listed Coombabah Lake Conservation Park, an area of international conservation significance. There are several threatened fauna species that reside in Nerang National Park including the greater glider, koala, glossy black-cockatoo, Richmond birdwing butterfly, grey-headed flying fox, powerful owl, echidna, and tusked frog. Conservation-significant flora known to occur in Nerang National Park include Rhodamnia rubescens, Rhodomyrtus psidioides, Cassia marksiana, Endiandra floydii, Endiandra hayesii, Macadamia integrifolia, Sophora fraseri, Randia moorei, Leichhardtia coronata, and Leichhardtia longiloba. Two near threatened rainforest plant species are known to occur in the gullies and along the wetter creeks, Richmond birdwing butterfly vine and the long-leaved tuckeroo.

Recreation
The Nerang National Park is used for all sorts of sports such as horse riding, mountain biking and trail running. The park consist of many fire trails and tracks making it very popular for bike riding, horse riding and walking.

See also

 Protected areas of Queensland
 Kombumerri clan

References

External links

 Map of Nerang National Park

Tourist attractions on the Gold Coast, Queensland
National parks of South East Queensland
2018 Commonwealth Games venues
Mountain biking at the Commonwealth Games
Cycling at the 2018 Commonwealth Games